Papular xanthoma is a cutaneous condition that is a rare form of non-X histiocytosis.

See also 
 Non-X histiocytosis
 List of cutaneous conditions

References 

Monocyte- and macrophage-related cutaneous conditions